This is the electoral history of Thomas Woodrow Wilson, a Democrat, who served as the 28th President of the United States (1913–1921), and earlier as the 34th Governor of New Jersey (1911–1913). 

Wilson's electoral record is fairly short compared with most other American Presidents. Throughout his lifetime Wilson competed in only three public elections, winning all of them.

1910 New Jersey gubernatorial race

Candidates
Major party candidates
Woodrow Wilson, Democratic
Vivian M. Lewis, Republican

Other candidates
Wilson B. Killingbeck, Socialist
 C. F. Repp, Prohibition Party
John C. Butterworth, Socialist Labor Party of America

Results

1912 Presidential Election

Democratic party nomination

1912 Democratic Party presidential primaries 
Wilson emerged the overall victor from the 12 Democratic Party caucuses and presidential primaries held in the lead up to the 1912 Democratic National Convention. The primary process was not what it is today however, most states did not hold primaries or caucuses and the party was not bound by the results in the way it is today.

The Democratic National Convention 
The 1912 Democratic National Convention was one of the most protracted and contested in history. Wilson lost the first thirty ballots to House Speaker Champ Clark. Even though Clark secured a majority on the 9th Ballot, to be the party nominee, DNC rules at the time required at least two-thirds, so the voting continued. Wilson's chances steadily increased after he received the endorsement of William Jennings Bryant starting on the 10th Ballot. After initially trailing and almost giving up hope, Wilson finally prevailed on the 46th Ballot.

General Election 
In the general election, Wilson faced two major opponents: incumbent Republican President William Howard Taft, and former Republican President Theodore Roosevelt, running on the "Bull Moose" Party ticket. Eugene V. Debs was the Socialist Party candidate and attracted far from token support. At the 1912 Republican National Convention Taft narrowly won re-nomination against Roosevelt, under whom he had served as Vice President. Roosevelt felt he had been cheated by party bosses and along with his supporters walked out of the convention. This split proved as expected, to be a major boost for Democrats in the general election. Wilson went on to become the first Democrat victor in a presidential election since 1892.

Results 
On November 5, Wilson captured the presidency handily by carrying a record 40 states.

Wilson won the presidency with a lower percentage of the popular vote than any candidate since Abraham Lincoln in 1860. Taft's  result remains the worst performance for any incumbent president, both in terms of electoral votes (8) and share of popular votes (23.17%). His 8 electoral votes remain the fewest by a Republican or Democrat, matched by Alf Landon's 1936 campaign. 

Despite his clear victory in electoral college votes, Wilson's popular vote total was less than that of William Jennings Bryan, in any of his three preceding presidential campaigns as the Democratic Party's nominee for president. In only two regions, New England and the Pacific, was Wilson's vote greater than the greatest Bryan vote. Wilson won a plurality, not a majority of the popular vote. Wilson's popular vote percentage was lowest of any victor in a U.S. Presidential Election since Abraham Lincoln in 1860.

1916 Presidential Election 

In 1916, Wilson ran for re-election. After easily securing re-nomination at the Democratic Convention, Wilson went on to narrowly win the general election against Republican Charles Hughes.

References 

Woodrow Wilson
Wilson, Woodrow
Wilson, Woodrow